Zarboneh (also  known as Zarrowboneh) is a village in Posht-e Arbaba Rural District, Alut District, Baneh County, Kurdistan Province, Iran. At the 2006 census, its population was 144, in 26 families. The village is populated by Kurds.

References 

Towns and villages in Baneh County
Kurdish settlements in Kurdistan Province